The Utah Parks Company Service Station in Bryce Canyon National Park was built in 1947 to serve automobile-borne visitors to the park. The service station was designed for the Utah Parks Company by architect Ambrose Spence in a style that was sympathetic to the prevailing National Park Service Rustic style, but was much simpler and more modern in character. In this manner, it foreshadowed the consciously simplified designs developed during the Mission 66 project.

The service station is located between the Bryce Canyon Lodge and Sunrise Point. The dominant feature is a coursed sandstone wall that curves around the structure. The front of the service station is similar to many modern stations, with a series of flat roofs in different planes projecting from the stone wall.  A prominent canopy shelters the pumps. The interior comprises a sales room, storage room, service bay and two toilets.

The station was placed on the National Register of Historic Places in 1995.

References

External links

 at the National Park Service's NRHP database

National Register of Historic Places in Bryce Canyon National Park
Transportation buildings and structures on the National Register of Historic Places in Utah
Retail buildings in Utah
Park buildings and structures on the National Register of Historic Places in Utah
Gas stations on the National Register of Historic Places in Utah
National Register of Historic Places in Garfield County, Utah
1947 establishments in Utah
Properties of the Union Pacific Railroad